Sree is a 2005 Indian Telugu film which stars Manoj Manchu and Tamannaah (in her Telugu debut). The film received negative reviews and was a commercial failure.

Plot
Bhikshapati (Devaraj) is the cruellest landlord in Rayalaseema. He is on his way to hunt down the family of Sandhya (Tamanna) who stay in Bhuvaneswar. Sree (Manoj) grows up in Bhuvaneswar with his widowed mother (Sukanya). Sree falls in love at first sight with Sandhya. When things are getting right between Sandhya and Sree, Bhikshapati's men enter Bhuvaneswar. Sree rescues the family of Sandhya from Bhikshapati's men. Then he also finds out that there is some connection between his father and Bhikshapati's men. The rest of the story is about how he returns to Rayalaseema and rescues the people of village from the clutches of the feudal landlord Bikshapati.

Cast

Soundtrack
The music was composed by Sandeep Chowta and released by Aditya Music.

References

External links 
 

2005 films
2000s Telugu-language films
Films scored by Sandeep Chowta